Arrington Dixon is an American politician who is a former Chair and Member of the Council of the District of Columbia of Washington, D.C.

Early years
Dixon was born in Anacostia in Washington, D.C., to James and Sally Dixon.

Council of the District of Columbia

1975–1979
In November 1974, Dixon was chosen to represent Ward 4 when voters elected the first members of the Council of the District of Columbia, the legislature of the city's new home rule government. The initial term for the Ward 4 seat, like those for half the council seats, was only 2 years, to provide for staggered council elections in later years, but in 1976 Dixon was reelected to a full four-year term.

1979–1983
In 1978, council chairman Sterling Tucker ran for mayor rather than seeking reelection. Dixon, who was halfway through his Ward 4 term, decided to run for Chair of the Council and won. He served 4 years. In 1982, Dixon ran for re-election, but he was defeated in the Democratic primary by David A. Clarke.

Dixon was later appointed by Mayor Marion Barry to serve as a public member of the National Capital Planning Commission.

1997
More than a decade later, Dixon returned to the council as an at-large member for a few months in 1997 when he was chosen in August by the District of Columbia Democratic State Committee to replace Linda Cropp, who had vacated her at-large seat to become chairman. The appointment lasted only until a December special election, in which he was defeated by then-Republican David Catania. Catania was sworn in on December 15, 1997.

Personal life
In 1966, he married Sharon Pratt Kelly, and they had daughters Aimee and Drew. His daughters were born in 1968 and 1970. The couple divorced in 1982 after sixteen years of marriage.

References

External links
Arrington Dixon Papers finding aid
Old D.C. Council Campaign Posters - Ghosts of DC blog

African-American people in Washington, D.C., politics
Members of the Council of the District of Columbia
Living people
Year of birth missing (living people)
Washington, D.C., Democrats
2004 United States presidential electors
21st-century African-American politicians
21st-century American politicians